Santiago Posteguillo Gómez is a Spanish philologist, linguist and author, born in Valencia in 1967.  He has become known for a number of novels set in Ancient Rome, especially his Scipio Africanus and Trajan trilogies.

Biography

Academic career
Santiago Posteguillo achieved his doctorate at the University of Valencia. He went on to study creative literature in the United States at Denison University, in Granville, and linguistics and translation at several universities in Great Britain.

He is currently senior lecturer in English Language and Linguistics at the Universitat Jaume I, Castellón, Spain, specialising in 19th-century fiction. He pays attention to the Elizabethan theater and the relationship between English and American literature with film, music and other arts. He is also president of the European Association of Languages for Specific Purposes (AELFE), and a member of the Editorial Board of the international journals English for Specific Purposes and Written Communication.  He is author of over seventy academic publications, including Netlinguistics: Language, Discourse and Ideology in Internet (2003) and the Spanish Computing Dictionary: English-Spanish, Spanish-English (2004).  He lives in Puçol in the comarca of Huerta Norte, in the Valencian Community, Spain.

Writing
Posteguillo started by writing crime novels, and during his time as a student at Valencia he used to write poetry. His first novel, Africanus: Son of the Consul, was published in 2006 and formed the first part of his trilogy on Scipio Africanus, the Roman general who defeated Hannibal in the Battle of Zama.  The second part, The Accursed Legions, was published in 2008, and by 2013 had reached its ninth edition.  The final part, The Betrayal of Rome, came out in 2009.  The same year he revised the three novels, now bestsellers. 

In 2011 he published The Emperor's Assassins, the first part of a new trilogy about the ascent to the throne of Trajan, the first Roman emperor of Spanish origin. The trilogy continued in Circus Maximus, published on August 29, 2013, and the final novel of the trilogy, The Lost Legion, was published in the spring of 2016.

He has also contributed to the newspaper Las Provincias.

Awards 
 Finalist, City of Zaragoza Historical Novel Award, 2009 for The Accursed Legions.
 Best Historical Novelist award, Hislibris 2009 for The Betrayal of Rome.
 Valencian Literature Award, 2010.
Valencian Lyrics Award 2010, in regard of his four historical novels up to that time.
Received an award at the Cartagena Historical Novels Week (Semana de Novela Histórica de Cartagena), 2010.
 Literature Prize of the cultural programme Continuará, La 2 channel of Televisión Española in Catalonia, 2012.
Nominated for Valencian Literary Critics Awards (Premios de la Crítica Valenciana) in the category of "essays and other genres" in 2013 for his work, The night when Frankenstein read Don Quijote, and in 2014 for La sangre de los libros. In the category of "narrative" his novel Circus Maximus was nominated in 2013.
Winner of the Barcelona Historical Novel Prize (Premio Internacional de Novela Histórica Barcino), 2014.
Recognised as among the "Valencians of the 21st Century" by the newspaper Las Provincias.

Works

Scipio Africanus trilogy 
The first trilogy published. The author reconstructs ancient Rome during the republic. The plot includes events and real characters from the history of Rome.
 Africanus: Son of the Consul (Africanus: el hijo del cónsul), Ediciones B, 2006.
At the end of the 3rd century BC., Rome was at risk from the Carthaginian army under the command of one of the greatest military strategists of history, Hannibal. His alliance with Philip V of Macedonia planned the annihilation of Rome as a state and the division of the powers between Carthage and Macedonia. But fortune intervened to change this fact. A few years before the war started, a child was born who was destined to change the course of history: Scipio.
 The Accursed Legions (Las legiones malditas), Ediciones B, 2008.
Scipio, known by the name of Africanus, who received many of the military qualities of his father and uncle, had also created some important enemies: Hasdrubal, brother of Hannibal; and the Punic general Giscón. Enemies also survive in Rome, where Senator Maximus Q. Fabius forced Scipio to accept the task of leading the legions V and VI which stayed neglected for a long time in Sicily.
 The Betrayal of Rome (La traición de Roma), Ediciones B, 2009.
The author resolves the questions that have been opened in the previous two novels.

Trajan trilogy 

 The Emperor's Assassins (Los asesinos del emperador), Planeta, 2011. 
This story begins on September 18 of the year AD 96 and covers the following 35 years of Roman history, including a civil war, the Colosseum, the Praetorian Guard and border wars, and the rise of an imperial dynasty under Trajan.
  Circus Maximus - Trajan's rage (Circo Máximo - La ira de Trajano), Planeta, 2013. 
In this second novel the emperor Trajan returns. This time, his life is in danger as an assassination plot is being prepared. The book covers the conquest of Dacia (present-day Romania) and the construction of the longest bridge in the ancient world.
 The Lost Legion (La Legión Perdida), Planeta, 2016. 
This covers Trajan's ambitions for conquest, under the shadow of the disastrous Parthian campaign led by Crassus 150 years earlier.

Julia series 

 Me, Julia (Yo, Julia), Planeta, 2018.
 And Julia Challenged The Gods (Y Julia Retó a los Dioses), Planeta, 2020.

Other 

 The night Frankenstein read Don Quixote (La noche en que Frankenstein leyó El Quijote), Planeta, 2012.
A collection of short stories in which the author takes a look at some events of literature, revealing some of its secrets:  the real writers of the works of Shakespeare or the real discoverer of the potential of Harry Potter.

References

External links 

 Santiago Posteguillo website
 Bukus: the works of Santiago Posteguillo
 Jacinto Antón. "Trajan would have been able to solve the present-day crisis", interview marking the publication of The Emperor's Assassins, El País digital, 13 October 2011
 Evaristo Amado. "Rome always had great generals", interview with Posteguillo about The Betrayal of Rome, ABC digital, 16 November 2009
 "Human nature hasn't changed much during more than 2000 years of history", interview in La Voz de Galicia, 11 November 2009
 Africanus, el hijo del cónsul de Santiago Posteguillo, review of Africanus: Son of the Consul, Mónica-Serendipia blog, 23 September 2011

People from Valencia
Writers from the Valencian Community
University of Valencia alumni
Academic staff of Jaume I University
21st-century Spanish writers
Spanish historical novelists
Spanish male novelists
1967 births
Living people